Frank Pahl is a Michigan-based musician/composer, working in several styles including "toy pop", or music made with toys.  He works primarily in Wyandotte and Ann Arbor, Michigan, and has exhibited his work in Canada, Europe and Japan, as well as the United States.

Musical life 
Pahl has worked in several groups, including Only a Mother, Sublime Wedge, Immigrant Suns and currently in Scavenger Quartet, a freeform musical group, and Little Bang Theory, a "toy" music trio.
Frank has worked with other avant-garde musicians like Eugene Chadbourne and Fred Frith.  He frequently collaborates with Professors Terry Saris and Peter Sparling
Frank has built and exhibited a lot of "automatic instruments"

Qualifications and awards 
Pahl was awarded the Master of Fine Arts degree in Art and Design from the University of Michigan
Pahl was awarded the Kresge Art Fellowship in 2010.

Personal life 
Pahl was born February 11, 1958, in Trenton, MI, and played euphonium in high school.
Pahl grew up in Wyandotte and got turned onto music listening to FM radio in the 70s.

Discography

Solo 
 The Cowboy Disciple - Pahl's first solo release - 1991
 The Romantic Side of Schizophrenia- 1994
 In Cahoots- 1997 (Vaccination Records)
 Remove The Cork 1998 (Demosaurus Records)
 Back from Beyond 2003
 Song of War and Peace 2007

Scores 
 Loose Threads - Dance score commissioned by Terri Sarris as composer and dancer - 1995

Collaborations 
 Thunderclap - Live at the Den Haag Korzo Theatre Field Recordings 3 - Luc Houtkamp & Guests  Frank Pahl - Engineer, Banjo - 1996
 Boss Witch - Shaking Ray Levis (Shaking Ray Records)  My favorite improvising duo on this here planet, Dennis Palmer and Bob Stagner get together with some of their favorites (JD Parran, Davey Williams, Frank Pahl, Mary Richards & Steve Beresford).  - 1997
 In Cahoots - Pahl collaborates on separate tracks with: The Immigrant Suns, Eugene Chadbourne, Only a Mother, Shaking Ray Levis, Luc Houtkamp, David Greenberger, Missy Gibson, Brian Poole and more. - 1997
 In Cahoots vol. 2- 2021 (Bandcamp)
 In Cahoots vol. 3- 2021 (Bandcamp)
 In Cahoots vol. 4- 2021 (Bandcamp)
 In Cahoots vol. 5- 2022 (Bandcamp)
 In Cahoots vol. 6- 2022 (Bandcamp)
 Music for Desserts - Frank Pahl and Klimperei (in poly sons - France)  - 2001
 Mayor Of The Tennessee River - David Greenberger & Shaking Ray Levis (PelPel Recordings) - 2003

As a band member 
 Riding White Alligators - Only a Mother   The first release by Only a Mother. -1987
 The Romantic Warped - Only a Mother  - 1989
 Studio Animals - Only a Mother  - 1990
 Naked Songs For Contortionists - Only A Mother - 1991
 Feral Chickens - Only A Mother - 1995
 More Than Food - Immigrant Suns (Phonetic Records) Frank Pahl - Farfisa Organ, Siren, Euphonium, Engineer - 1998
 Damned Pretty Snout - Only A Mother - 1998
 Field Recordings - Immigrant Suns (Phonetic Records)  Frank Pahl - Engineer, Alto Clarinet - 2001
 Whistling for Leftovers- Scavenger Quartet - (Snowdonia - Italy)   Scavenger Quartet (Doug Gourlay of Only a Mother, Tim Holmes of Major Dents, and Joel Peterson of Immigrant Suns and XHG) was originally formed to perform original jazz waltzes for the choreography of Peter Sparling. We got along so well we decided to call it a group. Dave Mandl of The Wire wrote "a chamber jazz hybrid that is much more intimate than Only a Mother but with an equally vast palette."  And Ralph Valdez of WDET added "Future-rustic might be an apt description of the Scavenger sound which achieves a fusion that is simultaneously antiquated and avant garde."  - 2001
 Supernova - Immigrant Suns 2002 (Phonetic Records) Frank Pahl - Harmonium, Euphonium
 We Who Live On Land- Scavenger Quartet- 2004 (Acidsoxx Musiks)
 Hats - Scavenger Quartet - 2012 (Acidsoxx Musiks)

Compilations 
 Studio Animals - Various   In the '80s I began releasing cassette-only compilations.  This vinyl release was my foray into the big time.  Contributors include Eugene Chadbourne, Only a Mother, Rascal Reporters, Major Dents and more. - 1989
 Passed Normal Vol.5 - Various Artists - Frank & Major Dents contribute one track to this ever-eclectic collection series assembled by FOT Records. It started out as a cassette only collection, mutated to vinyl, and now on CD. - 1992
 Lyrics By Ernest Noyes Brookings - Various Artists - 1992
 LSD C&W, Pt.2 - Eugene Chadbourne w/Frank Pahl & Only A Mother - 1992
 The Nerve Events - Various Artists w/Dr Nerve - 1993
 Lyrics By Ernest Noyes Brookings II - Various Artists - 1995
 Unsettled Scores - Various Artists - 1995
 I Still Feel Like Myself - David Greenberger with special guests (PONK Home Recordings) How's this for a lineup: Only a Mother, Eugene Chadbourne, Davey Williams, Billy Tipton Memorial Saxophone Quartet (minus Amy), Tatsu Aoki and David and I. All previously unreleased material. - 1995
 Eyesore: A Stab At The Residents - Various Artists - Tribute to the Residents - 1996
 State Of The Union - Various Artists (Atavistic) - Compilation curated by Elliot Sharp - 1996
 Haikus Urbains - Various Artists - 1997
 Atomic Milk-Throwers (with Scavenger Quartet) - Various Artists -2000
 Misique Du Jouet - Various Artists (Novel Cell Poem - Japan)   Including Frank Pahl, Klimperei, Pascal Comelade, David Fenech, Itoken, Harpy & more. Japanese toypop label Novel Cell Poem releases a bunch of previously unreleased tracks in a beautiful package with informative book insert (if you read Japanese). - 2003

References 

1958 births
Living people
Penny W. Stamps School of Art & Design alumni
American pop musicians
American male composers
21st-century American composers
21st-century American male musicians